Petroleum Geoscience is a quarterly peer-reviewed scientific journal published by the Geological Society of London and the European Association of Geoscientists and Engineers. It covers research in geoscience and technology associated with petroleum and reservoir engineering. According to the Journal Citation Reports, the journal has a 2011 impact factor of 1.161.

References

External links
 
 

Petroleum geology
Geology journals
Mining journals
Publications with year of establishment missing
English-language journals
Quarterly journals
Geological Society of London academic journals